Fassel (translated "barrel") is a surname of German origin.  Notable people with the surname include:

 Hirsch Bär Fassel, pioneer of the Reform Judaism movement
 Jim Fassel, American football coach
 Preston Fassel, Jewish-American writer

See also
Fasel, surname
Fossel, surname

Surnames of German origin